Ningbo Vocational Education Central School (VEC; simplified Chinese: 宁波市职业技术教育中心学校; traditional Chinese: 寧波市職業技術教育中心學校) is a national-level key vocational school in Ningbo, China. It was established in 1957 under the name "Ningbo 18th High School" or "Yifu vocational senior high school".

Honor 
 National-level key vocational school
 Education and scientific research of advanced collective
 Modern education technology school

Departments 
 Dept. of Computer network technology 
 Dept. of Electronic commerce
 Dept. of Graphic design
 Dept. of Computerized accounting
 Dept. of Computer software design
 Dept. of CNC tooling making
 Dept. of Auto repair
 Dept. of Numerical control
 Dept. of Urban railway system control
 Dept. of Urban rail transit management
 Dept. of Mechatronics
 Dept. of Industrial product design

References 

Vocational education in China